Diego Alfredo Soto Riffo (born 22 October 1998) is a Chilean professional footballer who plays as a left-back for Deportes Iquique.

References

External links
 

1998 births
Living people
People from Concepción, Chile
Sportspeople from Concepción, Chile
Association football defenders
Chilean footballers
Chile youth international footballers
Universidad de Concepción footballers
Cobreloa footballers
San Luis de Quillota footballers
Deportes Limache footballers
Deportes Iquique footballers
Chilean Primera División players
Primera B de Chile players
Segunda División Profesional de Chile players
21st-century Chilean people